The Koro Sea or Sea of Koro is a sea in the Pacific Ocean between Viti Levu island, Fiji to the west and the Lau Islands to the east, surrounded by the islands of the Fijian archipelago.

It is named after Koro Island.

References

Further reading
 
 

Seas of the Pacific Ocean
Bodies of water of Fiji
Seas of Oceania